The Schibe is a mountain of the Glarus Alps, located south of Linthal in the canton of Glarus. It lies north of the Bifertenstock, on the range separating the Sand valley from the Limmeren valley that also includes the Selbsanft.

The mountain lies within the municipality of Glarus Süd. In a broader sense, they are part of the Selbsanft massif.

References

External links
Schiben on Hikr

Mountains of the Alps
Alpine three-thousanders
Mountains of Switzerland
Mountains of the canton of Glarus